Cesena railway station serves the city and comune of Cesena, in the region of Emilia-Romagna, northern Italy.  Opened in 1861, it forms part of the Bologna–Ancona railway.

The station is managed by Rete Ferroviaria Italiana (RFI), while the commercial area of the passenger building is managed by Centostazioni and train services are operated by Trenitalia. Each of these companies is a subsidiary of Ferrovie dello Stato (FS), Italy's state-owned rail company.

Location
Cesena railway station is situated at Piazza Giorgio Sanguinetti, to the northeast of the city centre.

History
The station was opened on 1 September 1861, together with the rest of the Bologna–Forlì section of the Bologna–Ancona railway.

Features
The passenger building is a rectangular structure on two levels.  On the ground floor, there are services for travellers and guests, and upstairs are offices. The ground floor is made of brick and has eleven arches. The upper floor is faced with brick and its front and back walls have eleven mullioned windows decorated with a cornice.

The station has a goods yard with adjoining goods shed.  The tracks in the goods yard have been dismantled.  A parking lot has been installed in their place, and the goods shed converted into a warehouse. The architecture of the goods shed is very similar to that of other Italian railway stations.

The station yard consists of four tracks all with a platform and shelter. The platforms are connected by a pedestrian underpass and each is equipped with an elevator.

Train services
The station is served by the following service(s): (incomplete)

High speed services (Frecciabianca) Milan - Parma - Bologna - Ancona - Pescara (- Foggia - Bari)

Passenger and train movements
The station has about 2.5 million passenger movements each year.

The passenger trains calling at the station are regional, express, InterCity, InterCity Night and Frecciabianca services.

A total of about 100 passenger trains serve the station each day.  Their main destinations are Bologna Centrale, Ancona, Rimini and Piacenza.

Interchange
In front of the passenger building there is the Cesena bus terminal. The operator of the bus services is Start Romagna. Urban bus lines 1, 3, 5, 6, 11, 12, 13, 21 and 41 make a stop at the railway station. Urban bus line 93 and suburban buses depart at the bus station, the main destinations of the suburban buses are Forlì and Forlimpopoli (line 92), Cesenatico (line 94), Savignano sul Rubicone (line 95) and Bagno di Romagna and Sarsina (line 138).

The car park at the site of the former goods yard has a private ample parking. There are two public parkings in front of the station (by payment) and several parking options in the surrounding area.

Gallery

See also

History of rail transport in Italy
List of railway stations in Emilia-Romagna
Rail transport in Italy
Railway stations in Italy

References

External links

This article is based upon a translation of the Italian language version as at January 2011.

Railway Station
Buildings and structures in Cesena
Railway stations in Emilia-Romagna
Railway stations opened in 1861
1861 establishments in Italy
Railway stations in Italy opened in the 19th century